The "Farmyard Song" is a cumulative song about farm animals, originating in the British Isles and also known in North America.

It is known by various titles, such as:

 "I Bought Me a Cat"
 "I Love My Rooster"
 "I Bought Me a Horse"
 "My Cock Crew"
 "The Green Tree"
 "The Barnyard Song"
 "There Was An Old Man of Tobago"

Summary
In the first verse, the narrator tells of buying or having a rooster, cat, horse or other animal, feeding them under a tree, and the call the animal makes. Each subsequent verse introduces a new animal, then repeats the calls of the animals from previous verses.

Versions

There were several versions known in the Thames Valley in the early part of the 20th century. A version collected in Bampton, Oxfordshire around 1916 began as follows:

Musicologists Loraine Wyman and Howard Brockway collected "The Barnyard Song" in Kentucky in 1916. This version began,

Some American variants are not cumulative, but instead group all the animal calls together at the end of the song.

Adaptations and recordings
Aaron Copland included the song as "I Bought Me a Cat" in his 1950 song cycle, Old American Songs (part I).
"I Went to Market", The Watersons, Green Fields (1981)
"My Cock Crew", Con Greaney, Traditional Singer (1991)
"Bought Me a Cat", Barney & Friends, on the episode "Down on Barney's Farm" (1992)

References

Cumulative songs
English folk songs
American folk songs
Year of song unknown
Songwriter unknown
Songs about animals
Songs about farmers